The Nothing but Love World Tour was the ninth and final concert tour by American recording artist, Whitney Houston. It was her first major tour in almost a decade and was used to promote her seventh studio album I Look to You released in 2009.

Prior to Houston performing two dates in Russia mid-December 2009, the official tour started on February 6, 2010 in Asia; also visiting Australia and Europe. The tour was the 34th highest-earning of 2010, grossing over $36 million with 48 to 50 shows performed.

Background
The tour was announced on October 12, 2009 on Houston's official website. By way of introduction, she stated:

The tour began with two rehearsal dates in Russia, under an unadvertised title. At the end of the rehearsal, the tour's title was changed to "Nothing But Love World Tour" with an "official" commencement in February 2010. Houston explained the meaning behind her tour's title is how she overcame her tough times. "I chose this title because what I had under any circumstance was love […] I wouldn't have overcome tough time without my mom and my daughter. My daughter is especially like a friend who supported me and stayed with me at the studio when I was working on the album."

Public criticism
On February 22, the opening night of the Australian leg of the tour suffered negative reviews from critics. Her performance in the Brisbane Entertainment Centre was poorly received, and some fans reportedly walked out of the arenas. Houston's vocal condition was described as hoarse. Another action which came under fire from fans was when she paused from singing her song "I Will Always Love You" for many moments while she took a drink of water.

Houston's promoter commented that Houston smokes cigarettes and stated "It is what it is. She's comfortable with the show she's performing. She knows she's not hitting every note like she used to. But it's value for money; it's Whitney Houston warts and all."
Houston received a similar response during her concert at the Forum Copenhagen. Some spectators stated the performance was not up to par on what they had expected; others stated that the singer is a legend, has been on the music scene for 25 years at the time, and considering what she had been through, the performance was fine. Having grossed over $36 million, the tour itself was a financial success; however, the promoter, Andrew McManus, lost $2 million bringing her to Australia.

Opening acts
Anthony Callea (Australia)
Azaryah Davidson (Entire European tour)
Waylon (London)
Alex Gardner (Glasgow)
Karima (Milan, Rome)
 Marc Sway (Switzerland)
Moto Boy (Stockholm)
Axl Smith (Helsinki)

Setlist

Notes
December 12: the concert in Saint Petersburg, Houston performed "Step by Step", in place of "Exhale (Shoop Shoop)." 
During the concerts in March "Missing You" was not performed. 
Houston did not perform "Step by Step" and "I Didn't Know My Own Strength"  during shows in Dublin and select dates in England.
March 1: the concert in Melbourne, Australia, Houston did not perform "I Didn't Know My Own Strength", "If I Told You That" and "Exhale (Shoop Shoop)." Additionally, she briefly performed "Never Can Say Goodbye" and "Like I Never Left". 
March 4: the concert in Adelaide, Australia, Houston performed "Who Would Imagine a King" and "I Have Nothing" with a fan. 
April 13: the concert in Birmingham, England, Houston performed "I Am Changing." Additionally, Houston included the video interlude for "One Moment in Time".
April 20: the concert at The O2 in Dublin, Ireland, Houston was joined on stage by an audience member to perform "Greatest Love of All". On select tour dates in Europe, Houston performed "Stormy Weather" as a tribute to legendary singer/actress Lena Horne.
May 1: at the SEC Centre in Glasgow, Scotland, Houston did not perform "It's Not Right but It's Okay." The song was also not performed in Milan, Italy and in Zurich, Switzerland. May 3, the concert at the Mediolanum Forum in Milan, Italy and May 9, at Hallenstadion in Zurich, Switzerland, Houston began the encore with "I Wanna Dance With Somebody (Who Loves Me)", in place of "Million Dollar Bill".

Shows

Cancellations and rescheduled shows

Critical reception
 
Despite upsets from spectators, the tour received mixed to negative reviews from critics for the Australian and European legs of the tour.

Kathy McCabe (The Daily Telegraph) was not impressed with Houston's performance at the Acer Arena. She states, "Her acoustic set of old favourites unfortunately could not hide the very obvious problems with her voice, the strain and those coughs that punctuated the Brisbane show were back. By the time she got to the gospel section of the show a steady stream of disappointed, saddened and angry fans started streaming out the doors."
Cameron Adams (Herald Sun) gave Houston's performance at the Rod Laver Arena a positive review, despite media upset from her performance in Brisbane. He writes, "Houston is just a more human superstar in 2010, now with added flaws that give her character. She hits all the right notes in I Look to You, the new song about what she calls her 'down times'. Indeed every time she hits a huge note her devoted audience break into applause."
Candice Keller (The Advertiser) states that Houston still has "it" after viewing her performance at the Adelaide Entertainment Centre. She continues to write, "She knows how to engage a crowd and keep the fans eating from the palm of her hand. She'll tease with a knowing and tuneful hum, or tell a story about what brought her to today."
Kim Dawson (Daily Star) found the performance at the LG Arena "forgettable" stating, Boos and jeers of: 'Where are you' filled the arena. When Whitney returned in a much wiser choice of black sparkly frock she said: 'I heard you got a little pissed off while I changed my clothes and dried off. But I'm here now.'
Morwenna Ferrier (The Observer) applauds Houston's concert at the Trent FM Arena Nottingham. She further writes, "She kicks off successfully with two ballads from her 2009 album, I Look to You, 'For the Lovers' and 'Nothin' But Love' (love really is a theme with Houston.) The crowd, now warmed up, begins rattling with joy as she struts around all finger-clicky, black and proud during 'It's Not Right'. The songs include moments of genuine bonkersness."
John Meagher (The Independent) praised Houston's backing vocalist and her brother, Gary Houston for the performance at The O2 in Dublin. He continues to write, "She spends more time chatting to the audience than singing in the early stages, although her conversation rarely strays beyond the 'I love you, Dublin' type. At one point she fixates on a young girl in the front row, but what initially is charming tries the patience of the audience and eventually becomes tedious. Even the more tolerable songs -- 'My Love is Your Love', for instance -- are carried by the strength of her backing vocalists and the enthusiastic singing of the crowd. There are slivers of the super-talented young Whitney -- a high note here, a spine-tingling pause there on 'I Will Always Love You' -- but they arrive so infrequently it hardly matters. Instead, you are left with the memory of her botched attempts to wring some magic from 'I Wanna Dance with Somebody' and 'How Will I Know?'"
John Aizlewood (Evening Standard) gave her performance at The O2 Arena one out of five stars, stating "Where once she soared, now she wheezes and croaks, bludgeoning her perfect pop single I Wanna Dance With Somebody (Who Loves Me) into karaoke submission; stripping the moving My Love Is Your Love of all emotion and inflicting grisly carnage on I Will Always Love You (if she is late-period Judy Garland, this is her Over The Rainbow)."
Fiona Shepherd (The Scotsman) gave the show at the Scottish Exhibition and Conference Centre two out of four stars. She writes, "It was obvious from this performance that she has lost her vocal agility, her stamina, her poise and her wits – or so it seemed from her nervous laughter, repetitive thank yous and rambling personal tributes. Her band were practiced at covering for her while she took time out to pat away the sweat, re-apply her make-up, impart another nugget of eccentric insight and generally procrastinate."

Personnel
Band
Musical Director / Drums – Michael Baker
Percussion – Bashiri Johnson
Keyboards – Jetro DaSilva
Acoustic guitar – Jetro DaSilva
Bass guitar – Matthew Garrison
Keyboards – Shedrick Mitchell
Guitar – Sherod Barnes
Keyboards/Orchestrater – Adi Yeshaya
Background vocalists – Gary Houston, Sharlotte Gibson, Cindy Mizelle, Valerie Pinkston
Choreography
Choreographer – Jeri Slaughter
Assistant choreographer – Paul Monte
Dancers
Dres Reid, Ryan Chandler, Tre Holloway, Shannon Holtzappfel
Tour Management 
Manager – Tony Bullock

References

External links

2009 concert tours
2010 concert tours
Whitney Houston concert tours